Alite is an impure form of tricalcium silicate, sometimes formulated as  ( in cement chemist notation), typically with 3-4% of substituent oxides. It is the major, and characteristic, phase in Portland cement. The name was given by Törnebohm in 1897 to a crystal identified in microscopic investigation of Portland cement. Hatrurite is the name of a mineral that is substituted .

Composition and structure

The alite found in Portland cement differs in composition from simple tricalcium silicate. A typical composition is:

In practice, the composition varies with the bulk composition of the clinker, subject to certain limits. Substitution of calcium ions or orthosilicate ions requires that electric charges be kept in balance. For instance, a limited number of orthosilicate ions can be replaced with sulfate ions, provided that for each sulfate ion, two aluminate ions are also substituted.

Polymorphs
Tricalcium silicate is thermodynamically unstable below 1250°C, but can be preserved in a metastable state at room temperature by fast cooling: on slow cooling it tends to revert to belite and CaO.

As the temperature changes, it passes through several polymorphic states:

The polymorphs differ structurally by minor deformations from the basic hexagonal structure.

Hydration steps
Alite is the major phase in Portland cement responsible for setting and development of "early" strength.  The other silicate, belite contributes "late" strength, due to its lower reactivity.  Alite is more reactive because of its higher Ca content, and the presence of an oxide ion in the lattice.  During clinker grinding, first step of partial dissolution of C3S involves hydration of superficial oxide ions and leads to a hydroxylated C3S surface.

 

It reacts with water (roughly) according to the reaction:

Which can also be written in the cement chemist notation as:

  +  C-S-H + 

The hydrate is referred to as the calcium silicate hydrate – "C-S-H-" – phase.  It grows as a mass of interlocking needles that provide the strength of the hydrated cement system.  High alite reactivity is desirable in Portland cement manufacture, and this is achieved by retaining, as far as possible, high temperature polymorphs, in crystals that are small, distorted and highly defective.  Defects provide sites for initial water attack.

Alite as precursor of silicate phases found in medieval lime mortar
The composition of alite rich in CaO (71.6 wt. %) and relatively poor in SiO2 (25.2 wt. %) (see the hereabove  table) may help to understand why in particular conditions, if a sufficiently high temperature is reached in a lime kiln during enough time, alite can also be directly formed by pyrolizing only siliceous limestone (containing amorphous SiO2 impurities up to 25 – 30 wt. %). Hydraulic mortar or pre-Portland cement may have been occasionally produced on a small scale in this way during the medieval epoch in locations where limestone was cemented by amorphous silica or contained chert nodules or a lot of clay impurities.

This is likely the reason why some old medieval lime mortars used to build the Tournai cathedral (Belgium) exhibit an unexpected hydraulic character as revealed by a mineralogical study made by Mertens et al. (2006) who evidenced the presence of wollastonite and rankinite along with calcium silicate hydrate phases in lime mortars. In the area of Tournai (Belgium), the Tournaisian limestones are particularly rich in amorphous silica and exploited as building stone and for making lime mortar since very ancient ages. It is unknown if the cathedral builders of this area were aware of the hydraulic properties of their lime mortar or intentionally developed its use after their fortuitous finding.

Detection
See the article on belite.

See also

Notes

Silicates
Calcium compounds
Cement